Drive-In Movie Time: Bobby Vinton Sings Great Motion Picture Themes is Bobby Vinton's twelfth studio album, released by Epic Records. Consisting entirely of songs from films, it was recorded and released to capitalize on Vinton's latest single at the time, "Theme from 'Harlow' (Lonely Girl)". All of the songs are from films that were released during the 1950s and 1960s.

Track listing

Personnel
 Bob Morgan – producer
Cardell of Pittsburgh – cover photos
Henry Parker – cover photos

Charts
Singles – Billboard (United States)

References

1965 albums
Bobby Vinton albums
Epic Records albums